is a series of video game compilations for Nintendo 3DS developed by M2 and published by Sega, each featuring enhanced versions of older Sega games with added stereoscopic 3D.

Many of the games included in the compilations in this series have also been released individually as 3D Classics.

Sega 3D Reprint Archives

 is the first compilation in the Sega 3D Reprint Archives series. It was released exclusively in Japan on December 18, 2014.

Games

Sega 3D Classics Collection

 is the second compilation in the Sega 3D Reprint Archives series. It is the only title in the series to be released outside of Japan. It was released in Japan on December 23, 2015, in North America on April 26, 2016, and in Europe on November 4, 2016.

In Japan, a retail box containing both this compilation and the original Sega 3D Reprint Archives, was released on December 23, 2015 (the same day as this compilation).

It includes ten games, five (three in Japan) of which have not been released separately on the Nintendo eShop. There are two extra games (Fantasy Zone II: The Tears of Opa-Opa and Maze Hunter 3D) available in the extras menu, and one secret game (Fantasy Zone), unlocked by tapping the lower left corner of the extras screen, then tapping the enemy that appears.

The cover artwork was illustrated by Pokémon character designer Ken Sugimori.

Games

Reception

Sega 3D Classics Collection received "mixed or average" reviews from critics according to aggregate review website Metacritic.

Sega 3D Reprint Archives 3: Final Stage

 is the third compilation in the Sega 3D Reprint Archives series. It was released exclusively in Japan on December 22, 2016.

, a retail box containing all three games in the series, was released on December 22, 2016 (the same day as this compilation).

The compilation was delisted from Nintendo eShop on December 21, 2022, alongside 3D After Burner II.

Games

See also
 3D Classics

References

External links
 

2014 video games
2015 video games
2016 video games
Nintendo 3DS games
Nintendo 3DS-only games
Sega Games franchises
Sega video game compilations
Sonic the Hedgehog video games
Video games developed in Japan